Evil Dead: The Game is a 2022 survival horror game based on the Evil Dead franchise. It was developed and published by Saber Interactive. It features co-operative gameplay and player versus player (PvP) combat. The game features Bruce Campbell as Ash Williams, as well as Dana DeLorenzo as Kelly Maxwell and Ray Santiago as Pablo Simon Bolivar from the television series Ash vs Evil Dead.

Evil Dead: The Game was released for PlayStation 4, PlayStation 5, Windows, Xbox One and Xbox Series X/S on May 13, 2022. It will be released for Nintendo Switch at a later date. It was made available for free to PlayStation Plus subscribers on February 7, 2023.

Gameplay 
Evil Dead: The Game is an asymmetrical multiplayer game. The game features both co-operative gameplay and player versus player (PvP) combat, although the single-player mode requires an internet connection to be played. The game features a level-up system, as well as skill tree mechanics. It will also feature multiple maps, including the cabin in the woods from the Evil Dead film series, along with over 25 weapons, including Ash's chainsaw and boomstick. At launch, the game features four playable survivor classes (Leaders, Warriors, Hunters and Supports), and four playable demons (the Warlord, the Puppeteer, the Necromancer and the Plaguebringer).

Post-launch content 
After the release of Evil Dead: The Game, various new updates were included either for free or as part of a season pass. On July 13, 2022, the Castle Kandar map, based upon Army of Darkness, was added to the game, alongside new outfits for Arthur and Henry. On September 8, 2022, David Allen and Mia Allen, characters from the 2013 film, Evil Dead, were added to the game. As well as the new characters, a new class, known as Plaguebringer, based upon Army of Darkness, was added to the game on the same day.

On February 2, 2023, a new Ash vs Evil Dead update and the Immortal Power Bundle, a premium downloadable content pack, were released. With those new content additions, Splatter Royale, a new game mode that features players battling up to 40 Deadites until only one player remains, was added to the game. The premium bundle included new outfits for Ash Williams, Pablo Simon Bolivar, Kelly Maxwell and the Puppeteer. The premium bundle also added Ruby Knowby to the game. As part of the free update, a new outfit for Pablo Simon Bolivar was added alongside the grenade launcher and the scythe, two new weapons.

Marketing 
Evil Dead: The Game was announced at The Game Awards on December 10, 2020. Official reveal trailers for the game were uploaded to YouTube that same day.

American rapper Method Man released a song, "Come Get Some", in a collaboration with the game; the song is produced by Statik Selektah, and features verses from Method Man's son PXWER and U-God's son inTeLL. It contains samples of the original The Evil Dead score by Joseph LoDuca and lines spoken by Ash Williams. The song is featured in the game's launch trailer, which was released on May 14, 2022.

Special effects artist Tom Savini designed an exclusive Ash skin that was given to players who preorder the Collector's Edition of the game.

Reception 

Evil Dead: The Game received "mixed or average" reviews for PlayStation 5 and Xbox Series X/S according to review aggregator Metacritic; the PC version received "generally favorable" reviews.

Mark Delaney of GameSpot gave the game a score of 6 out of 10, praising its faithfulness to the Evil Dead franchise and class-based character design while criticizing the progression as slow, story missions as undeveloped, and PvP combat as unbalanced. Jordan Gerblick of GamesRadar+ commended the game's approachability, graphics, and homages made to the franchise while taking issue with the lack of content, difficulty in single-player missions, and the lack of more traversal options. Travis Northup of IGN gave the game 8 out of 10, writing, "Evil Dead: The Game is an awesome asymmetric multiplayer game that, like its source material, is far better than it has any right to be given its frustrating lack of polish and being somewhat light on maps and modes." Hardcore Gamer appreciated the game's visuals, atmosphere, fluid combat, strategy, online play, and fanservice material while taking minor issues with the redundant audio and lack of content. VG247 rated the game 4 stars out of 5 and stated, "Evil Dead: The Game is a good time...however, horror fans without an affinity towards the series will likely find more fun in alternative multiplayer horror games, and they'll probably find more accessibility-friendly games, too."

The game sold 500,000 copies in five days.

See also 
 Dead by Daylight – an asymmetric multiplayer game that features Ash Williams as a playable character
 Friday the 13th: The Game – an asymmetric multiplayer game based on the Friday the 13th film franchise
 Predator: Hunting Grounds
 Resident Evil: Resistance

 List of horror video games

References

External links 
 

Asymmetrical multiplayer video games
2022 video games
Cooperative video games
2020s horror video games
Nintendo Switch games
PlayStation 4 games
PlayStation 5 games
Saber Interactive games
The Evil Dead (franchise) video games
Unreal Engine games
Video games developed in the United States
Video games set in forests
Video games set in Tennessee
Windows games
Xbox One games
Xbox Series X and Series S games